Šerua (in late sources Serua) was a Mesopotamian goddess closely associated with the Assyrian head god Ashur. It is uncertain in which way they were related to each other.

Character
Šerua is best attested in association with Ashur. She was the only deity regarded as a member of his family who was innately associated with him. While references to Zababa and Ninurta as his sons are known, they were a result of partial identification with Enlil. Mullissu (Ninlil) came to be viewed as his wife in the same process. However, it is unclear how the relation between Šerua and Ashur was initially described. Whether she was originally his wife or daughter was already a subject of scholarly inquiry in the neo-Assyrian period. In modern scholarship, it is sometimes assumed that she was originally his wife, but was later demoted to the position of his daughter or sister when Mullissu became a part of the Assyrian state pantheon as Ashur's wife. A theory based on Aramaic inscriptions from the Parthian period instead makes her initial position that of a daughter of Ashur, who later came to be viewed as his second wife.

A number of ancient sources connect her name with the Akkadian word šērtum, "morning." For example, the text KAR 128 refers to her as ilat šērēti, "goddess of the morning hours." However, Manfred Krebernik points out this might only be a folk etymology.

According to Wilfred G. Lambert, Šerua should not be confused with Erua, a title of Marduk's wife Zarpanit, though other researchers do accept the possibility that writings of her name such as dEDIN-u-a or dEDIN, read as dE4-ru6, might be evidence of conflation of these two names based on their similar pronunciation.

Worship
Oldest attestations of Šerua come from the late Sargonic period. She continued to be worshiped in Assur even after the fall of the Neo-Assyrian Empire, as late as in the Parthian period. A temple of Ashur and Šerua, the E-metebalāšegiagallana (Sumerian: "house, worthy of office, provided with a bride") is known from a Babylonian text. Additionally, a possible sanctuary dedicated to her, perhaps located in a temple of Ashur, is attested in an inscription of Shalmaneser I. One of the city gates of Assur was named after her. A text called the Divine Directory of Assur in modern scholarship gives its full name as "Šerua Brings Favour on her Land." However, it does not appear in enumerations of the city's gates in other sources, such as inscriptions of Erishum I and Shalmaneser III. 

An Assyrian royal ritual taking place in the month Šabaṭu involved Šerua, as well as Kippat-māti and Tašmetu. It is possible their role was to mediate on behalf of the reigning kings with his deceased ancestors and with the highest gods of the pantheon, such as Anu. She is also mentioned in the Coronation Hymn of Ashurbanipal. In a Takultu ritual text from the reign of this king she appears after various manifestations of Ashur, Enlil, Anu, Ea, Sin, Adad and Ishtar, but before Ninurta. In a similar text from the reign of Sennacherib she precedes Mullissu.

Šerua is attested in theophoric names. For example, the daughter of Ashur-uballit I bore the name Muballiṭat-Šerua.

Possible Babylonian attestations
It has also been suggested that Šerūa was introduced to Uruk during a period of neo-Assyrian control as a reference to tenant farmers working in a field belonging to this deity is known from the Eanna archive. The name was written as dEDIN in this case. It is also possible that the epithet Aššurītu, "the Assyrian," referred to her in documents from this city. In other contexts, it referred to Mullissu.

References

Bibliography

Mesopotamian goddesses